Jordan Ceramic Industries is a manufacturing company in Jordan.  It was founded in 1966 and is based in Zarka and Amman.  Jordan Ceramic produces floor and wall tiles, and vitreous sanitary ware, i.e. toilets, sinks and showers.  It operates 3 factories; it produces 2.5 million square meters of tile and 4000 tons of sanitary ware per year.

The stock of Jordan Ceramic is listed on the Amman Stock Exchange's ASE Weighted Index.

External links
Jordan Ceramic Industries information page at JordanMall.com 

Manufacturing companies of Jordan
Ceramics manufacturers
Manufacturing companies established in 1966
Jordanian brands
Zarqa
Companies listed on the Amman Stock Exchange